James Ronald Chi (1948 – 26 June 2017) was an Australian composer, musician and playwright. His best known work is the 1990 musical Bran Nue Dae which was adapted for film in 2009.

Early life
Chi was born in Broome, Western Australia in 1948 to a father of Chinese and Japanese descent and a mother of Scottish, Bardi and Nyulnyul descent.

Career 
From 1981 to 1982 Chi was the lead singer of the band Kuckles, before they disbanded.

Chi's most acclaimed work is Bran Nue Dae, written in collaboration with his band Kuckles, Scrap Metal, the Pigram brothers and friends. Bran Nue Dae, is a partly autobiographical work which took Jimmy many years to write. It celebrates family, forgiveness and reconciliation and was a hit at the Festival of Perth in 1990 where it was performed by the Black Swan Theatre. It went on to tour Australia extensively and it was Australia's most successful musical play of the early 1990s.

One of the famous verses from a song in the musical sums up Chi's dry humour and sharp political approach:

There's nothing I would rather be
Than to be an Aborigine
and watch you take my precious land away.
For nothing gives me greater joy
than to watch you fill each girl and boy
with superficial existential shit.

The musical won the prestigious Sidney Myer Performing Arts Awards in 1990. The following year the published script and score won the Special Award in the Western Australian Premier's Book Awards. It brought acclaim for many Aboriginal artists including Ernie Dingo, Josie Ningali Lawford and Leah Purcell. The musical's success was also instrumental in the formation of the Black Swan Theatre Company.

Chi also wrote the musical Corrugation Road, which was first performed by the Black Swan Theatre at the Fairfax Studio in Melbourne in 1996 before an Australian national tour. Corrugation Road concerns mental health, abuse, sexuality and religion, treated with humor and optimism. Both musicals played a significant role in the development and direction of Indigenous performance.

Chi's songs have been covered by such artists as the Irish singer Mary Black, and Aboriginal singer Archie Roach.

Chi's music has come to represent the colour of Broome. Broome's Opera Under the Stars festival has featured Chi's "Child of Glory", from Bran Nue Dae, at every festival since 1993. His hymns are regularly sung at Aboriginal funerals in Broome.

Discography

Soundtrack albums

Awards and honours
In 1991, Chi was awarded the Human Rights and Equal Opportunity Commission Drama Award for Bran Nue Dae, for the musical about a young Aborigine's journey to consciousness.

Australia Council for the Arts
The Australia Council for the Arts is the arts funding and advisory body for the Government of Australia. Since 1993, it has awarded a Red Ochre Award. It is presented to an outstanding Indigenous Australian (Aboriginal Australian or Torres Strait Islander) artist for lifetime achievement.

|-
| 1997
| himself
| Red Ochre Award
| 
|-

Deadly Awards
The Deadly Awards were an annual celebration of Australian Aboriginal and Torres Strait Islander achievement in music, sport, entertainment and community. They ran from 1995 to 2013.

 (wins only)
|-
| rowspan="2"| 1998
| Corrugation Road <small> (with Kuckles and The Pigram Brothers)
| Excellence in Film or Theatrical Score 
| 
|-

In 2004 he was acknowledged by the WA Government as a State Living Treasure.

Later life and death
Chi spent most of his later life at home in Broome with his family and friends. He died in Broome Hospital on 26 June 2017.

Works
 Broome songwriters with Michael Manolis and Ron Harper (Hodja Educational Resources, 1985) 
 Bran Nue Dae (Currency Press, 1991) 
 Corrugation Road (sound recording – Angoorrabin Records, p1996)

References
 Aboriginality in Recent Australian Drama, Katharine Brisbane.
 
  from Arts in Australia
  from Cultural Dissent, Green Left Weekly issue No. 27
 Jimmy Chi AustLit Agent (Retrieved 27 February 2016)

Notes

1948 births
2017 deaths
Australian dramatists and playwrights
Australian people of Chinese descent
Australian people of Japanese descent
Australian people of Scottish descent
Indigenous Australian musicians
Indigenous Australian writers
Indigenous Australians from Western Australia
People from Broome, Western Australia
Musicians from Western Australia
Australian musical theatre composers
People with bipolar disorder